Flat Branch is a  long 2nd order tributary to the Fisher River in Surry County, North Carolina.

Course
Flat Branch rises on the Red Hill Creek and Mitchell River divides about 2 miles southwest of Blevins Store, North Carolina.  Flat Branch then flows generally east to join the Fisher River about 2 miles southeast of Blevins Store.

Watershed
Flat Branch drains  of area, receives about 49.2 in/year of precipitation, has a wetness index of 340.91, and is about 63% forested.

See also
List of rivers of North Carolina

References

Rivers of North Carolina
Rivers of Surry County, North Carolina